Scott MacLeod may refer to:

Scott MacLeod (ice hockey) (born 1959), Canadian ice hockey player 
Scott MacLeod (rugby union) (born 1979), Scottish rugby union footballer
G. Scott MacLeod (born 1965), Canadian multimedia artist and film director

See also
 Scott McLeod (disambiguation)